Sisters Under the Skin, later renamed The Romantic Age, is a 1934 American drama film directed by David Burton and starring Elissa Landi, Frank Morgan, and Joseph Schildkraut. It was the first film Landi made for Columbia Pictures.

Plot
Millionaire John Hunter Yates (Frank Morgan) tries to recapture his youth by abandoning his business and going to Europe. His wife Elinor (Doris Lloyd) refuses to go with him. Yates meets a young actress, Blossom Bailey (Elissa Landi), and takes her with him. In Paris, Blossom falls for musician Zukowski (Joseph Schildkraut) and they fall in love. Yates tires of the bohemian life, and returns to America with Blossom and Zukowski. At Blossom's urging, he finances Zukowski's musical career, and he becomes famous. Elinor tries to win her husband back, even as Yates becomes certain Blossom and Zukowski are betraying him. Yates discovers Blossom has been true to him, and returns to his wife—allowing Blossom to marry.

Production
Sisters Under the Skin was directed by David Burton, and was the first picture Elissa Landi made for Columbia after being fired by 20th Century Fox. The film was produced under the working title Excursion to Paradise. Robert Kalloch, Columbia Pictures' newly-hired chief costume designer, designed Elissa Landi's wardrobe.

Cast
The cast includes:
 Elissa Landi as Judy O'Grady aka Blossom Bailey
 Frank Morgan as John Hunter Yates
 Joseph Schildkraut as Zukowski
 Doris Lloyd as Elinor Yates

References

External links
 

1934 films
1934 drama films
American drama films
Films directed by David Burton
Films with screenplays by Jo Swerling
Columbia Pictures films
American black-and-white films
1934 comedy films
1930s English-language films
1930s American films